Amorbia stenovalvae is a species of moth of the family Tortricidae. It is found in Guatemala and Mexico, where it has been collected at altitudes ranging from 250 to 2,000 meters.

The length of the forewings is 12.4–12.7 mm. The ground colour of the forewings is light brown, but the median fascia are dark brown and the subterminal fasciae are dark brown. The hindwings are light, except for a patch of darker scales at the apex.

Etymology
The species name refers to the narrow valva and is derived from Greek stenos (meaning narrow).

References

Moths described in 2007
Sparganothini
Moths of Central America